Bull Savannah is a settlement in Jamaica. Bull Savannah is located north of Alligator Pond and features Bull Savannah Police Station, Bull Savannah Primary School.

References

Populated places in Saint Elizabeth Parish